Paxtakor is a district of Jizzakh Region in Uzbekistan. The capital lies at the city Paxtakor. The district consists of one city (Paxtakor), one urban-type settlement (Gulzor) and 7 rural communities.

References 

Districts of Uzbekistan
Jizzakh Region